Georgenthal is a municipality in the district of Gotha, in Thuringia, Germany. The former municipalities Leinatal, Hohenkirchen and Petriroda were merged into Georgenthal in December 2019.

References

Gotha (district)
Saxe-Coburg and Gotha